Archibald Sommers (or Summers) was the first member of the United States Marine Corps to be promoted to the rank of Sergeant Major. He joined the Marine Corps in June 1799, was promoted to Sergeant Major on January 1, 1801, and was discharged in June 1802.

See also

References

Year of birth missing
Year of death missing
United States Marine Corps non-commissioned officers